Gelora Kieraha Stadium is a multi-use stadium in Ternate City, North Maluku, Indonesia.  It is currently used mostly for football matches and is used as the home stadium for Persiter Ternate. The stadium has been inaugurated since 1958, currently with a capacity of 15,000 people.

References

Sports venues in Indonesia
Football venues in Indonesia
Buildings and structures in North Maluku